is a Japanese Nippon Professional Baseball player for the Yomiuri Giants in Japan's Central League.

External links

Living people
1981 births
People from Ōita (city)
Japanese baseball players
Nippon Professional Baseball infielders
Yomiuri Giants players
Saitama Seibu Lions players
Japanese baseball coaches
Nippon Professional Baseball coaches